The collared peccary (Dicotyles tajacu) is a species of artiodactyl (even-toed) mammal in the family Tayassuidae found in North, Central, and South America. It is the only member of the genus Dicotyles. They are commonly referred to as javelina, saíno, or báquiro, although these terms are also used to describe other species in the family. The species is also known as the musk hog. In Trinidad, it is colloquially known as quenk.

Taxonomy
Although somewhat related to true Old World pigs, and frequently referred to as a pig, this species and the other peccaries are no longer classified in the pig family, Suidae. Although formerly classified in the genus Pecari, studies in 2020 placed them in the genus Dicotyles, based on an unequivocal type-species selection; these studies have been accepted by the American Society of Mammalogists. Currently, the IUCN still places them in the genus Pecari.

Description

The dental formula is: 2/3,1/1,3/3,3/3. The collared peccary has small tusks that point toward the ground when the animal is upright. It has slender legs with a robust or stocky body. The tail is often hidden in the coarse fur of the peccary.

Range and habitat
The collared peccary is widespread throughout much of the tropical and subtropical Americas, ranging from the Southwestern United States to northern Argentina. They were reintroduced to Uruguay in 2017, after 100 years of extirpation there. The only Caribbean island where it is native, however, is Trinidad. Until fairly recently, it was also present on the nearby island of Tobago, but is now exceedingly rare (if not extirpated) due to overhunting by humans. An adaptable species, it inhabits deserts, xeric shrublands, tropical and subtropical grasslands, savannas, shrublands, flooded grasslands and savannas, tropical and subtropical dry broadleaf forests, and several other habitats; it is also present in habitats shared by humans, merely requiring sufficient cover. Peccaries can be found in cities and agricultural land throughout their range, where they consume garden plants. Notable populations are known to exist in the suburbs of Phoenix and Tucson, Arizona.

Due to the lack of fossil material or even specimens from archeological sites, it was assumed that javelinas only recently crossed into the US by way of Mexico. However, a fossil jaw of this species was discovered in Florida ("Collared peccary (Mammalia, Artiodactyla, Tayassuidae, Pecari) from the late Pleistocene of Florida", Richard C. Hulbert, Gary S. Morgan & Andreas Kerner), proving that at some point in the late Pleistocene the species had already inhabited part of the Southern US.

Diet
Collared peccaries are often classified as herbivores. They normally feed on cactus, mesquite beans, fruits, berries, seeds, roots, tubers, bulbs, palm nuts, grasses, other green vegetation, fungi, and insects. However, they will also eat eggs, snakes, fish, frogs, lizards, dead birds, and rodents if the opportunity presents itself. Despite all this supplementary diet, the main dietary components of this species are agaves and prickly pears. In areas inhabited by humans, they also consume cultivated crops and ornamental plants, such as tulip bulbs.

Predators 
The main predators of the collared peccary are cougars (Puma concolor), Mexican wolves (Canis lupus baileyi), coyotes (Canis latrans), jaguars (Panthera onca), and bobcats (Lynx rufus).

Behavior
Collared peccaries are diurnal creatures that live in groups of up to 50 individuals, averaging between six and nine animals. They sleep in burrows (often under bushes or larger systems of tree roots), but sometimes can be found in caves, abandoned mines, old desert tunnels, or among logs, felled trees and abandoned  timber.  However, collared peccaries are not completely diurnal. In central Arizona, they are often more active at night, and less so in the heat of the daytime.

Although they usually ignore humans, they will react if they feel threatened. They defend themselves with their tusks. A collared peccary can release a strong musk or give a sharp bark if it is alarmed. Amazonian peoples (including the Shipibos) sometimes raise and tame juvenile collared peccaries, if they are encountered.  

Peccary will also rub their scent onto rocks and tree stumps to mark their territory, and rub the scent on each other to help with identification.

The "giant peccary" 
The giant peccary (described as Pecari maximus) was a purported fourth species of peccary, first reported to have been seen in Brazil in 2000 by Dutch naturalist Marc van Roosmalen. In 2003 German natural history filmmaker Lothar Frenz filmed a group and gathered a skull which later served as the type (INPA4272). It had been known locally as caitetú-mundè, which Roosmalen et al. state the locals claimed was Tupí and meant "the collared peccary that is bigger and goes in pairs", as opposed to caitetú-de-bando, "the collared peccary that goes in herds". It was formally described in 2007, but the scientific evidence for its species status was quickly questioned, which also was one of the reasons for its initial evaluation as data deficient by IUCN in 2008. A review in 2011 moved the giant peccary into synonymy with the collared peccary (P. tajacu), which was followed by the IUCN the same year.

The reported range of the giant peccary encompasses the south-central Amazon between the Madeira and the Tapajós Rivers and northern Bolivia. It is restricted to terra firme forest, which is forest that does not flood annually. Unlike other peccaries in its range, the giant peccary was reported to mainly occur in pairs or small family groups.

According to its original description, the giant peccary is larger, longer-legged, and proportionally smaller-headed than the only other member of the genus, the collared peccary. Compared to most individuals of the sympatric populations of the collared peccary, the giant peccary also had thinner fur that is grizzled in brown and white, blacker legs, and a relatively faint collar. Based on a mtDNA study, the collared and the giant peccaries were estimated to have diverged 1.0–1.2 million years ago, but these results were later questioned due to the small sample size, low bootstrap support, and the absence of nDNA and cytogenetic results.

In 2011, a review noted that the measurements provided in the initial description were within those generally recognized for the collared peccary, and the behaviors supposedly unique to the giant peccary are also known from the collared peccary. They also provided new genetic evidence showing that collared peccaries from South America form a monophyletic clade that includes the giant peccary (without it the clade is paraphyletic). The major genetic split within the collared peccary is between a clade comprising North and Central American specimens, and a clade comprising South American specimens (the presumed contact zone is in Colombia, which has both clades). Furthermore, extensive infraspecific variations (both individual and locality-based) are known in the morphology of the collared peccary.

Gallery

Notes

References

External links

 Smithsonian Institution - North American Mammals: Pecari tajacu
 Smithsonian Wild: Pecari tajacu
Arizona Game and Fish Department – Living With Javelina

Peccaries
Mammals of the United States
Fauna of the Southwestern United States
Fauna of the Sonoran Desert
Ungulates of Central America
Mammals of Mexico
Mammals of Argentina
Mammals of Bolivia
Mammals of Brazil
Mammals of Colombia
Mammals of Ecuador
Mammals of French Guiana
Mammals of Guyana
Mammals of Paraguay
Mammals of Peru
Mammals of Suriname
Mammals of Trinidad and Tobago
Mammals of Venezuela
Mammals of the Caribbean
Fauna of the Amazon
Fauna of the Pantanal
Mammals described in 1758
Articles containing video clips
Taxa named by Carl Linnaeus
Fauna of the Sierra Madre Occidental
Taxobox binomials not recognized by IUCN